Apterygida is a genus of insects belonging to the family Forficulidae.

The species of this genus are found in Europe.

Species:
 Apterygida albipennis (Hagenbach, 1822) 
 Apterygida tuberculosa Shiraki, 1905

References

Forficulidae
Dermaptera genera